Thorney Island is an island (effectively a peninsula) that juts into Chichester Harbour in West Sussex. It is separated from the mainland by a narrow channel called the Great Deep.

Geography

The village of West Thorney lies on the east coast of the island and has been incorporated into a British Army military base which occupies the southern part of the island, south of Great Deep. A coastal public footpath, part of the Sussex Border Path encircles the island, but public access to the south of the island is limited to the footpath and the church of St Nicholas at West Thorney. Walkers using the footpath may be asked by intercom to provide their contact details (name, address and mobile phone number) at the security gates to access the southern part of the island. Walkers must keep to the footpath marked with the yellow posts. During the winter months, fortnightly shoots are held on Thorney for partridge, pheasant and snipe.

To the south of the island is Pilsey Island, now joined to Thorney Island by a sandbank, which is an RSPB nature reserve.

The 2001 census showed the island to have a resident population of 1,079.

Climate
The climate of Thorney Island is generally milder than elsewhere in the UK, but slightly cooler than other areas locally due to being quite rural.

The Met Office has an official weather station situated at Baker Barracks, the Royal Artillery base on Thorney Island.

RAF Thorney Island and Baker Barracks
In 1938, the RAF airfield on Thorney Island was built. Subsequently the Royal Navy expressed an interest in using the base. In 1980 West Thorney became host to many hundreds of Vietnamese families, accepted by the United Kingdom for settlement in the United Kingdom.
In 1985, a series of experiments referred to as the "Thorney Island Heavy Gas Dispersion Trials" investigating atmospheric dispersion of gases was carried out on the island.

1984 saw the base renamed Baker Barracks to house a Royal Artillery unit, the 26th Field Regiment Royal Artillery, armed with the FH70. Later, the 26th Field Regiment Royal Artillery was replaced on the island by the 47th Regiment Royal Artillery, armed with the Starstreak HVM. In January 2008, the 12th Regiment Royal Artillery moved to the island on their return from Germany.  47 Regiment subsequently relocated from Thorney Island to Larkhill, Wiltshire, under restructuring of the British Army as part of the Army 2020 programme.

In 2009, the airfield was used as a test track for a British-built steam car hoping to break the longest standing land speed record. The British Steam Car Challenge team included test driver Don Wales, nephew of the late Donald Campbell and grandson of Sir Malcolm Campbell.

References

External links

Detailed historical record about Thorney Island Airfield

Islands of England
Landforms of West Sussex